The County Metro League is a high school athletic league that is part of the CIF Central Section.

For the 2022-2023 school year, Madera South High School will be removed to the North Yosemite League and It will be replaced by Justin Garza High School.

Members
 Bullard High School
 Edison High School
 San Joaquin Memorial High School
 Madera High School
 Sanger Union High School
 Justin Garza High School

References

CIF Central Section